Gliese 623 is a dim double star 25.6 light years from Earth in the constellation Hercules. It was photographed by the NASA/ESA Hubble Space Telescope's Faint Object Camera in 1994. The binary system consists of two red dwarfs orbiting each other at a distance of 1.9 astronomical units.

See also
 List of star systems within 25–30 light-years

References

Further reading

External links
 Nasa page

Binary stars
Hercules (constellation)
M-type main-sequence stars
0623
080346